The three-letter abbreviation XSL may have multiple meanings, as described below:

 In computing, the Extensible Stylesheet Language: a set of language technologies for defining XML document transformation and presentation
 XSL Formatting Objects
 The XSL attack (eXtended Sparse Linearisation attack), a method for breaking ciphers
 The Xtreme Soccer League, a professional indoor soccer league